The Luce–Celler Act of 1946, Pub. L. No. 79-483, 60 Stat. 416, is an Act of the United States Congress which provided a quota of 100 Filipinos and 100 Indians from Asia to immigrate to the United States per year, which for the first time allowed these people to naturalize as American citizens. Upon becoming citizens, these new Americans could own property under their names and even petition for their immediate family members from abroad.

The Act was proposed by Republican Clare Boothe Luce and Democrat Emanuel Celler in 1943 and signed into law by U.S. President Harry S. Truman on July 2, 1946, two days before the Philippines became independent with the signing of the Treaty of Manila on July 4, 1946. Because of the imminent independence of the Philippines, Filipinos would have been barred from immigrating without the Act.

Prior to 1946, Indian nationals were not eligible to naturalize in the United States. They were also not allowed to obtain any form of permanent residency, a legal status introduced later under the Immigration and Nationality Act of 1952.

See also
 Asian immigration to the United States
 United States v. Bhagat Singh Thind

References

1946 in law
United States federal immigration and nationality legislation
Indian-American history
Pakistani-American history
Filipino-American history
Asian-American culture